University Place is a city in Pierce County, Washington, United States. Its population was 34,866 at the 2020 census.

Based on per capita income, University Place ranks 81st of 522 areas in the state of Washington to be ranked.

History
University Place received its name in the 1800s when the University of Puget Sound, a private liberal-arts college in North Tacoma, purchased land along the primary north–south route of Grandview Drive. The school sought to build a new campus there, but ended up selling the land back to the city for about $11,000. University Place remained an unincorporated part of Pierce County until the City of University Place was formed on August 31, 1995.

Today, University Place is largely suburban in character and functions as a mixed business and residential area with waterfront on the Puget Sound. The town is home to Curtis Senior High School and Charles Wright Academy.

Chambers Bay golf course opened in 2007 to favorable reviews. A Scottish links-style course, Chambers Bay hosted the 2010 U.S. Amateur and the 2015 U.S. Open.

University Place's news is primarily covered by The News Tribune (Tacoma), and is also covered by University Place Patch, a hyper-local news website that launched in October 2010, and sometimes by news media in Seattle. Earlier newspapers for the community were the weekly Suburban Times (1970s), published by Dave Sclair (who, starting in 1970, also published Western Flyer); and, in the 1980s, the Lakewood Press, published by Grace T. Eubanks and later Dane S. Claussen, which launched the University Place Press as a monthly and then biweekly before it folded in early 1989.

Geography
University Place is located at  (47.219545, -122.541610).

Demographics

2010 census
As of the census of 2010, there were 31,144 people, 12,819 households, and 8,476 families living in the city. The racial makeup of the city was 71.0% White, 8.5% African American, 0.8% Native American, 9.0% Asian, 0.8% Pacific Islander, 1.7% from other races, and 8.2% from two or more races. Hispanic or Latino of any race were 6.7% of the population.

There were 12,819 households, of which 32.7% had children under the age of 18 living with them, 47.9% were married couples living together, 14.0% had a female householder with no husband present, 4.2% had a male householder with no wife present, and 33.9% were non-families. 27.7% of all households were made up of individuals, and 9.5% had someone living alone who was 65 years of age or older. The average household size was 2.41 and the average family size was 2.94.

The median age in the city was 39.4 years. 23.6% of residents were under the age of 18; 9.3% were between the ages of 18 and 24; 24.3% were from 25 to 44; 28.9% were from 45 to 64; and 14.1% were 65 years of age or older. The gender makeup of the city was 47.0% male and 53.0% female.

2000 census
As of the census of 2000, there were 29,933 people, 12,149 households, and 8,212 families living in the city. The population density was 3,569.0 people per square mile (1,377.5/km2). There were 12,684 housing units at an average density of 1,512.4 per square mile (583.7/km2). The racial makeup of the city was 75.87% White, 8.74% African American, 0.72% Native American, 7.47% Asian, 0.56% Pacific Islander, 1.35% from other races, and 5.29% from two or more races. Hispanic or Latino of any race were 3.84% of the population.

There were 12,149 households, out of which 34.7% had children under the age of 18 living with them, 51.6% were married couples living together, 12.7% had a female householder with no husband present, and 32.4% were non-families. 26.1% of all households were made up of individuals, and 7.3% had someone living alone who was 65 years of age or older. The average household size was 2.45 and the average family size was 2.97.

In the city, the age distribution of the population shows 26.0% under the age of 18, 9.2% from 18 to 24, 28.6% from 25 to 44, 25.0% from 45 to 64, and 11.2% who were 65 years of age or older. The median age was 36 years. For every 100 females, there were 91.0 males. For every 100 females age 18 and over, there were 86.5 males.

The median income for a household in the city was $50,287, and the median income for a family was $60,401. Males had a median income of $42,452 versus $30,045 for females. The per capita income for the city was $25,544. About 6.0% of families and 7.3% of the population were below the poverty line, including 9.5% of those under age 18 and 3.8% of those age 65 or over.

Education
Most of University Place is in the University Place School District, which manages eight public schools. Primary schools teach kindergarten through fourth grade. Intermediate schools teach grades five through seven. Junior high is grades eight and nine. High school students are in grades ten through twelve.
Curtis Senior High
Curtis Junior High
Drum Intermediate
Narrows View Intermediate
Chambers Primary
Evergreen Primary
Sunset Primary
University Place Primary

Portions are in Tacoma Public Schools and in the Steilacoom Historical School District.

Notable people
Gary Larson, creator of The Far Side comic strips
John J. Nance, pilot and author
Bob Robertson, sportscaster, voice of the Washington State Cougars and Tacoma Rainiers
Brian Sullivan, politician and lawyer
Isaiah Thomas, star point guard for University of Washington and NBA point guard
Morgan Weaver - professional soccer forward for the Portland Thorns FC
Pat Tillman - American professional football player in the National Football League (NFL) who left his sports career and enlisted in the United States Army in May 2002 in the aftermath of the September 11 attacks.

References

External links
City of University Place

Cities in Washington (state)
Cities in Pierce County, Washington
Cities in the Seattle metropolitan area
Populated places established in 1888